List of contemporary writers from northern Uruguay includes writers identified with the regions of northern Uruguay. The area is also characteristic of some of their writings.

Introduction

The culture of Uruguay is focused on urban Montevideo and largely secular. However, a number of contemporary writers have worked and focused on the north of the country.

Contemporary writers by area of northern Uruguay

These include:

 Washington Benavides (Tacuarembó)
 Circe Maia - (Tacuarembó)
 Jorge Majfud - (Tacuarembó)
 Jesús Moraes - (Bella Unión)
 Tomás de Mattos - (Tacuarembó)
 Emir Rodríguez Monegal - (Melo)

See also

 List of Uruguayan writers

 
Uruguayan literature
writers
Uruguay